The 2022 season was Petaling Jaya City FC's 19th season since its establishment in 2004. The club participated in the Malaysia Super League for the 4th time since 2019.

Players
As of 7 January 2022

Statistics

Appearances

Last updated on 3 February 2023.

|-
! colspan=16 style=background:#dcdcdc; text-align:center|Goalkeepers

|-
! colspan=16 style=background:#dcdcdc; text-align:center|Defenders

|-
! colspan=16 style=background:#dcdcdc; text-align:center|Midfielders

|-
! colspan=16 style=background:#dcdcdc; text-align:center|Forwards

 
|-
! colspan=14 style=background:#dcdcdc; text-align:center| Players sent out on loan this season

|-
! colspan=18 style=background:#dcdcdc; text-align:center| Player who made an appearance this season but have left the club

|}

References

Petaling